The 2001–02 season was Reading's fourth season in Division Two, following their relegation from the Division One in 1998. It was Alan Pardew's third season as manager of the club. Reading finished the season in second place, earning promotion back to the First Division. In the FA Cup, Reading where knocked out by York City after the Second Round for the second year running, whilst in the League Cup, Aston Villa defeated Reading over in the Third Round. Reading also reached the Quarterfinals of the League Trophy, before defeat to Barnet.

Season review
See also Nationwide League Division Two

Squad

Left club during season

Transfers

In

Loans in

Out

Loans out

Released

Trial

Competitions

Division Two

Results summary

Results by round

Fixtures & results

Notes
Kick-off delayed until 20:00 from 19:45

League table

FA Cup

League Cup

League Trophy South

Squad statistics

Appearances and goals

|-
|colspan="14"|Players who appeared for Reading and left during the season:

|}

Goalscorers

Clean sheets

Disciplinary record

Notes

References

Soccerbase

Reading F.C. seasons
Reading

zh:雷丁2010年至2011年球季